Artemisia pontica, the Roman wormwood or small absinthe, is an herb used in the production of absinthe and vermouth. Originating in southeastern Europe (the specific name refers to the Pontus area on the shores of the Black Sea), it is naturalized over much of Eurasia from France to Xinjiang, and is also found in the wild in northeastern North America.

Artemisia pontica is called "little absinthe" because it is smaller in stature and leaf than the "great absinthe" A. absinthium. Flowers are small, yellowish, and appear in loose panicles at stem tips.

The essential oil contains cineol, camphor, thujone, and borneol among other components. It is said to be less bitter than great absinthe and is the principal flavoring of vermouth. It is commercially cultivated in Spain and Lithuania.

References 

pontica
Absinthe
Medicinal plants of Europe
Flora of Europe
Flora of Asia